The Horezu is a right tributary of the river Bistricioara in Romania. It flows into the Bistricioara near Romanii de Sus.

References

Rivers of Romania
Rivers of Vâlcea County